Houston High School is a fully accredited public high school located in Germantown, Tennessee, serving students in grades 9–12. The school was previously one of the eight high schools operating in the Shelby County School District. The principal is John Taylor. Houston Middle School and Riverdale Elementary (K-8) are the main feeder schools to Houston High since the creation of the Germantown Municipal School District in June 2014.

History
Houston High School was established in 1989 and is the sole high school of the Germantown Municipal School District (GMSD). Prior to June 2014, HHS was part of the Shelby County Schools system. The GMSD is a family of five schools, Dogwood Elementary (K-5), Farmington Elementary (K-5), Riverdale Elementary (K-8), Houston Middle School (6-8), and Houston High School (9-12). HHS offers nearly 25 Advanced Placement courses, being one of four schools in the state to offer the AP Capstone Diploma, and has approximately 200 students in the ACT "30 and Above" Club.  HHS athletic teams have earned 34 TSSAA state championships, including three girls state championships during the fall of 2015 (cross country, golf, and soccer), and have received "Best of the Preps" recognition in suburban Shelby County for the last eighteen years (1999–2016). HHS offers more than 60 clubs and activities.

In May 2018, the choir teacher was accused of having inappropriate interactions with students, and the principal was accused of inappropriate acts at a teacher's home. The principal resigned, and the choir teacher was fired, but later cleared of wrongdoing.

1994 Tornado
On November 27, 1994, a strong F2 tornado tore through the school and the surrounding area. Large sections of wall, windows, and parts of the roof were severely damaged by the tornado. The damage was so great that the school was condemned, and the next month was spent making repairs. Students were bused to nearby Germantown High School during the repairs.

Athletics
HHS athletic teams have earned 34 TSSAA state championships, including three girls state championships during the fall of 2015 (cross country, golf, and soccer), and have received "Best of the Preps" recognition in suburban Shelby County for the last eighteen years (1999–2016).

The Houston Mustangs football program has produced college players, with the most notable alumni being New England Patriots Defensive Tackle David Nugent and Washington Redskins Defensive End Jeremy Jarmon.

Former Mustang pitcher, Matt Cain, played 13 seasons in Major League Baseball (MLB) for the San Francisco Giants (Pitcher). A three-time World Series champion, Cain is regarded as a central figure of the Giants' success in the 2010s for his pitching and leadership.  Cain threw the 22nd perfect game in Major League Baseball history on June 13, 2012.

Beginning with the 2020-21 season, former NBA player Mike Miller was hired as the head boys' basketball coach. He has immediately established Houston as one of the top teams in the state after recruiting several highly touted prospects.

Fine Arts
In 2015, the band traveled to New York City to perform at Carnegie Hall. The marching band has been given multiple awards, notably the Chancellor's Cup for the Large School Division in the Vanderbilt Marching Invitational for 6 of the last 8 years (as of 2014). The Houston High Vocal Program is also acclaimed, with their a cappella group winning second at Nationals.

References

External links
 Houston High School Home Page
 The Houston Band
 The Houston Choir

Public high schools in Tennessee
Schools in Shelby County, Tennessee
Germantown, Tennessee
1989 establishments in Tennessee